Michael Shafir (4 January 1944 – 9 November 2022) was a Romanian–Israeli political scientist. He has been described as "one of the leading analysts of antisemitism and the treatment of the Holocaust in east-central Europe".

Shafir was born in Bucharest, Romania. He immigrated to Israel during the Communist period in Eastern Europe, later returning to Romania in 2005.

Shafir died on 9 November 2022, at the age of 78.

Works

References

1944 births
2022 deaths
Romanian Jews
Romanian emigrants to Israel
Scholars of antisemitism
Romanian political scientists
Israeli political scientists
Israeli people of Romanian-Jewish descent
Historians of the Holocaust
Historians from Bucharest
Radio Free Europe/Radio Liberty people
Academic staff of Babeș-Bolyai University